The 1974 Stockholm Open was a men's tennis tournament played on indoor hard courts which was part of the AA category of the 1974 Commercial Union Assurance Grand Prix and took place at the Kungliga tennishallen in Stockholm, Sweden. It was the sixth edition of the tournament and was held from 26 October through 11 November 1974. Fourth-seeded Arthur Ashe won the singles title, his second at the event after 1971, and earned $12,000 first-prize money.

Finals

Singles

 Arthur Ashe defeated  Tom Okker, 6–2, 6–2

Doubles

 Tom Okker /  Marty Riessen defeated  Bob Hewitt /  Frew McMillan, 2–6, 6–3, 6–4

References

External links
  
 ATP tournament profile
 ITF tournament edition details

Stockholm Open
Stockholm Open
Stock
October 1974 sports events in Europe
November 1974 sports events in Europe
1970s in Stockholm